Electoral firsts in Romania.

Women

Kingdom 

 Mayor – Luiza Zavloschi, (Buda) – 1930

People's Republic 

 Minister of Health - Florica Bagdasar - 1946
 Minister of Foreign Affairs – Ana Pauker – 1947
 Minister of Social Affairs – Stella Ernestu – 1952
 First Deputy Prime Minister – Elena Ceauşescu – 1980

Republic 

 Minister of Education- Ecaterina Andronescu – 2000
 Minister of Justice – Monica Macovei – 2004
 Prefect (of Bucharest) – Mioara Mantale – 2004
 President of the Chamber of Deputies – Roberta Anastase – 2008
 Minister of Tourism – Elena Udrea – 2008
 European Commissioner for Regional Policy – Corina Crețu – 2014
 Prime Minister – Viorica Dăncilă – 2018
 President of the Senate – Anca Dragu – 2020

References 

Elections in Romania
Lists of firsts
Romania politics-related lists